Loan Life Coverage Ratio
LLCR is a ratio commonly used in project finance. The ratio is defined as: Net Present Value of Cashflow Available for Debt Service ("CFADS") / Outstanding Debt in the period. Financial modelling of LLCR is now a standard metric calculated in a project finance model and has been standardized to a large extent but always needs to be aligned with local practice of the financiers as described in the transaction term sheet.

NPV(CFADS) is measured only up until the maturity of the debt tranche.

The ratio is one of the aspects used for estimates of the credit quality of a project from a lender's perspective.

Related ratios are:
Project Life Coverage Ratio (PLCR) and Reserve Life Coverage Ratio (RLCR).

The ratio usually is in a range from 1.25 for highly geared infrastructure investment to 2.5 or higher in an investments with more insecure income, such as oil and gas transactions.

See also
Debt service coverage ratio

References

Loans